NATO cartridge may refer to:

 Small arms
 9×19mm NATO (STANAG 4090)
 5.7×28mm NATO (STANAG 4509)
 5.56×45mm NATO (STANAG 4172)
 7.62×51mm NATO (STANAG 2310)
 12.7×99mm NATO (STANAG 4383)
 40 mm grenade
 Autocannons
 20×102mm (STANAG 3585), 20 mm caliber
 25×137mm and 25x184mm (STANAG 4173), 25 mm caliber
 27x145mm (STANAG 3820), 27 mm caliber
 30x113mmB and 30×173mm (STANAG 4624), 30 mm caliber
 35x228mm (STANAG 4516), 35 mm caliber
 Tank guns
 105x617mmR (STANAG 4458)
 120x570mmR (STANAG 4385)
 Artillery
 105 mm (STANAG 4425)
 155 mm (STANAG 4425)

Cartridge families
NATO cartridges